Agelasta mediofasciata is a species of beetle in the family Cerambycidae. It was described by Heller in 1913. It is known from the Philippines.

References

mediofasciata
Beetles described in 1913